Spa-La Sauvenière Airfield  is a general aviation airfield located in Spa, a municipality of Wallonia (southern Belgium). The field is managed by the regional (Walloon) authority, and is home to the Royal Aéro Para Club de Spa (RAPCS). Paradropping activities are in progress during all the year by the Skydive Spa Company and there is also a company with 1 or 2 helicopters called Heli&Co.
The nearby Francorchamps racetrack attracts a fair amount of air traffic when races are run.

See also 
Transportation in Belgium

References

External links 
 Royal Aéro Para Club de Spa

Airports in Liège Province
Airports established in 1909
Spa, Belgium